Józef Władysław Krogulski (4 October 1815, in Tarnów, Poland – 9 January 1842, in Warsaw, Poland), was a Polish pianist, conductor, teacher, and composer. He first studied with his father,  (1789–1859), and later studied with Józef Elsner and Karol Kurpiński at the Warsaw Conservatory. His half brother had the same name (sometimes  instead) and lived from 1843 to 1934.

Selected works

Orchestral 
 Overture in D minor (1831)
 Piano Concerto in E major (1830)
 Piano Concerto in B minor (1832)

Chamber 
 Octet in D minor, Op. 6, for piano, two violins, viola, flute, clarinet, cello and double bass (circa 1832)
 Piano Quartet, Op. 2 (1835)
 String Quartet

Piano 
 Piano Sonata (1829)
 La Bella Cracoviena
 Mazurka in D major
 Mazurka in E minor (a la Chopin)

Song 
 Last Goodbye
 Let us praise the Lord
 Mazur of the recent past
 Lullaby for eternal sleep
 Elegy Spirit
 Coquette
 God, how stupid it is

Choral 
 Requiem
 There are ten Polish masses for two to four voices
 Caravan in the Arabian Desert cantata for choir and orchestra
 Miserere cantata for soloists, choir and orchestra
 Passion oratorio for Good Friday
 Angus Dei for three bass voices
 Carol for male choir and organ

Opera 
 Oh, my little wife

References

External links 

 Scores by Józef Władysław Krogulski in digital library Polona

1815 births
1842 deaths
Male classical pianists
People from Tarnów
Polish classical composers
Polish classical pianists
Polish male classical composers
19th-century male musicians